Bones + Longing is the fifth studio album by Irish singer-songwriter Gemma Hayes.

The album was released on 14 November in Ireland and on 17 November in the UK, the US & Canada. It was released elsewhere around the world on 2 March 2015 and German speaking territories on 6 March 2015, with a vinyl release on 12 June 2015.

The album was recorded in Dublin, Noyant-la-Gravoyère and London.

Background and development
In June 2012, Gemma Hayes announced she was writing new material in Ireland. Hayes had previously planned to move back to Los Angeles to work on the album, but later decided against this decision and continued to reside in Dublin.

By 9 August 2012, Hayes announced she had begun a side-project with long-term producer David Odlum and was continuing to work on her own material. Hayes also confirmed the future release of a live limited edition vinyl (previously billed for 2013 release).Night & Day's release was deferred until spring 2014 and was funded through her Pledge Music campaign. By October 2012, Hayes began a short tour of Ireland and the UK, Hayes would not return to the live music scene until 2013.

By 22 April 2013, Hayes announced a new batch of songs were written while in Ireland and demos where being finalized in a studio in France where the bones of the fifth studio album (later titled named as Bones+Longing) were recorded.

During July 2013, Hayes returned to Ireland to tour as part of A Woman's Heart. On 16 August 2013 Hayes launched her Pledge Music campaign where fans and pledgers could support the album's production and release

During the early stages of the album's production Hayes became pregnant and production finished in late December and recommenced again in mid-February due to the birth of her baby. On 10 April 2014, Hayes revealed the titles of three new songs 'To Be Your Honey' (a preview of which was made available on her website), 'Palomino' and 'Making My Way Back'. Hayes later confirmed mixing and mastering took place in France the next month

In April 2014, Hayes performed a number of UK gigs prior to the release of the fifth studio album. These gigs were part of her Pledge Music campaign. On 16 June 2014, Hayes confirmed the album was completed.

On 24 June 2014, her management hinted the album's title as Bones & Longing. Following this Hayes discussed the album's production and confirmed new tracks were recorded including 'The Shit I Own’ and ‘Caught My Hand’. A 21-second snippet of a new track ‘Making My Way Back’ was also revealed.

On 9 July 2014, the album's producer David Odlum confirmed the albums was mixed and mastered and ready for a late autumn release. On 29 July 2014 Hayes' management confirmed a photoshoot took place to promote the forthcoming album release.

On 1 August 2014, Hayes confirmed through her Pledge Music page her fifth studio album is titled Bones + Longing.

On 22 September 2014, Hayes announced the first single release from album 'Chasing' would precede the album's release due in November.

The album was released independently through her own label Chasing Dragons (similar to Hollow of Morning and Let It Break), it was initially anticipated for the album to be licensed to other labels for release in other territories.

On 20 September 2014, the album's artwork was revealed. On 1 October 2014 the album's full track listing was revealed along with 30-second snippets of each track.

The album was released in Ireland, North America and the UK in November 2014. It received a wider international release in February/March 2015.

Release
The album is released through Chasing Dragons. The album was released in CD format in Ireland on 14 November 2014. It was then released digitally in Ireland, the UK and North America on 17 November 2015

The album was made available internationally from 17 November exclusively through her Pledge Music campaign. It became available on CD and iTunes in February 2015 and March 2015 in various territories. The album was distributed by Kartel (UK, US), Katel Bertus (France, Belgium), Shock (Australia/New Zealand), Membrane (Switzerland, Austria and Germany) and Fontana North (Canada).

The vinyl release was delayed numerous times before being made available in early June 2015. The limited deluxe edition will be released in late September/early October 2015.

Theme
The album's theme has been described as providing sonambulent pop/shoegaze textures that mix the dreamy with the spooky.

Artwork
On 20 September 2014 the artwork for the album was revealed, where it was announced Humphrey Bangham produced the artwork.

Release formats
The album was in digital format on Irish iTunes on 17 November 2014 with a bonus track 'The Shit I Own'. The standard CD version includes only 11 tracks (excluding 'The Shit I Own') released in Ireland on 14 November 2014. The standard vinyl edition features the original 11 tracks, while a very limited deluxe vinyl edition (300 in total) is featured in a 12" case bound hardback cover, with a 32-page booklet with exclusive photos from the recording process and song lyrics. Each deluxe edition is hand numbered. due for release in June 2015. Additional tracks will feature on the limited edition deluxe vinyl.

Single releases
Prior to the album's release 'Palomino' was initially planned to be the first promo release but was delayed and replaced with 'Chasing'. On 9 October 2014 'Chasing' was given for free to those who registered and supported her Pledge Music campaign. The track also appeared in the iTunes store in Ireland, Canada, US and UK on Friday, 10 October 2014 as part of the Bones+Longing pre-order. The single instantly downloaded upon pre-ordering the album. The second single release in Ireland is 'Making My Way'. This track featured in Aldi Ireland's Christmas advertising campaign.The song appeared on Irish television on 6 November 2014. The track later appeared in the Irish iTunes Store on 6 November 2014.

'Palomino' was finally released as a single on 18 April 2015 on a limited edition 7" vinyl to mark Record Store Day. The single was also released as a digital download.

'Laughter' is expected to be the next single release from the album and it is due for an international release on 7 August 2015.

Airplay
Irish radio picked up a number of the tracks from the album upon its release. "Chasing" did not receive the same amount of airplay as other tracks from the album. "Laughter" and "Making My Way Back" were added to the RTÉ 2XM playlist from early November. "Making My Way Back" had more commercial success than "Chasing". Both "Making My Way Back" and "Bones+Longing" received airplay on RTÉ Radio 1. 'Chasing' received airplay on BBC 6 Music. Following the album's release, both "Joy" and "I Dreamt You Were Fine" were picked up by Today FM.

Radio stations across the UK, Australia, France and Germany among others picked up "Palomino" for radio play, which proved popular on German and Australian radio.

Charts
Following the album's debut in the Irish Albums Chart it reached number 38. It reached number 4 in the Irish Indie Chart and number 10 in the Irish iTunes Album Chart.  This is her worst performing album from her portfolio despite the positive reviews. Its low position in the Irish Albums Chart is due to a number of factors such as; the download version of the album was released three days later than normal. On 17 November, the CD version was released, three days later than normal for the Irish marketplace. Also those albums downloaded or purchased through her Pledge Music campaign were ineligible to chart in Ireland.

The album failed to chart in other territories.

Promotion
Hayes began to promote the album in the Republic of Ireland between October 2014 to February 2015 making regular appearances on both national and local radio stations such as Today FM, TXFM and Newstalk performing tracks such as Making My Way Back and To Be Your Honey live in studio.

On 5 December 2014 Hayes was interviewed by arts and cultural show The Works on RTÉ One's where she performed 'To Be Your Honey'.

On 9 December 2014 she made an appearance on Newstalk where she performed two tracks performed 'Making My Way Back' and 'To Be Your Honey'.

As part of the promotion for the new album Hayes the Irish edition of The Sunday Times ran a feature on the artist on 14 December 2014. She would later appear on the cover of Cara Magazine Aer Lingus' in-flight magazine.

Hayes began to promote the album outside Ireland in early 2015 with interviews on BBC Radio in the UK, by March she travelled to France and Germany to do a number of performances. On 2 March the album received an international release with a press release in Paris at Centre Culturel Irlandais where she performed at the venue and did a number of promos for local and national radio in France. On 6 March, Hayes travelled to Germany for promotional purposes where she completed a number of interviews for both German radio and television. She later performed at Berlin's Bar Bobu.

On 24 March 2015 Hayes confirmed live dates across Ireland and the UK. On 24 March 2015 she shared the promo video for 'To Be Your Honey'. On the same day she completed an interview with RTÉ 2fm where she discussed motherhood, her Pledge music campaign and additional gigs in Ireland.

On 26 March 2015 a special promo video was released for To Be Your Honey recorded in Paris.

Track listing
All tracks written by Gemma Hayes.

Standard CD / download / vinyl version

Deluxe edition
The release of the limited deluxe edition of Bones+Longing was delayed numerous times. It was eventually released to fans from mid-September 2015. 
The deluxe edition features the original track listing from the standard vinyl release it also features two additional CD's. CD 1 features the standard album version and CD features Bonus material including previously unreleased tracks 'Palomino (Will Pharaoh remix)', 'Slowdive' and 'Swimming in the Flood'. Only 300 have been produced as part of her Pledge Music campaign. The 12" 180gm vinyl pressing comes cream in colour presented in a 12" case bound, hardback format which includes a 32-page booklet featuring exclusive photographs shot during the album sessions as well as song-lyrics. Each copy is hand numbered, personalized and signed by Gemma.

Tour
A short tour began on 4 October 2014 which took place until November with tour dates in the UK. In December 2014, Gemma Hayes toured with Bell X1's Paul Noonan as part of the Printer Clips the tour dates were in the Republic of Ireland. In February 2015, Hayes continued with further UK tour dates where she supported with Scott Mattew. Hayes is expected to confirm further dates for Ireland, France and Germany in mid-2015.

Hayes began her promo tour in the UK in October 2014 before touring Ireland with Paul Noonan's Printer Clips in December. By early 2015, Hayes completed a short UK tour as a support for Scott Mattews. By March 2015, she performed in Paris and Berlin and undertook an extensive tour of both Ireland and the UK that year.

Promo dates
 4 October 2014 – The Pound, Wiltshire, United Kingdom 
 7 November 2014 – The Railway, Winchester, United Kingdom

Tour with Printer Clips
 4 December 2014 – The Set Theatre, Kilkenny, Republic of Ireland with Printer Clips
 5 December 2014 – Vicar Street, Dublin, Republic of Ireland with Printer Clips 
 6 December 2014 – Triskel Christchurch, Republic of Ireland with Printer Clips
 7 December 2014 – Roisin Dubh,Galway, Republic of Ireland with Printer Clips
 5 September 2015 – Electric Picnic, Co. Laois, Republic of Ireland with Printer Clips

Promo dates and Scott Mattews tour
 14 January 2015 –  The Oslo, London, United Kingdom
 22 February 2015 – St Georges, Bristol, United Kingdom support for Scott Mattews
 23 February 2015 – RNCM Concert Hall, Manchester, United Kingdom support for Scott Mattews
 26 February 2015 – Cadogan Hall, London, United Kingdom support for Scott Mattews
 27 February 2015 – St Geogers Church, Brigton, United Kingdom support for Scott Mattews

Promo dates and Bones+Longing tour
 2 March 2015 – Centre Culturel Irlandais, Paris, France
 6 March 2015 – Bar Bobu, Berlin, Germany
 16 April 2015 – The Cellars Embassy, Portsmouth, United Kingdom
 2 May 2015 – The Louisiana, Bristol, United Kingdom 
 14 May 2015 – The Globe, Cardiff, United Kingdom
 16 May 2015 – Leaf Café, Liverpool, United Kingdom
 17 May 2015 – Manchester Gorilla, Manchester, United Kingdom
 19 May 2015 – The Louisiana, Bristol, United Kingdom
 12 June 2015 – Electric Circus, Edinburgh, United Kingdom 
 13 June 2015 – Óran Mór, Glasgow, United Kingdom
 18 June 2015 – Killarney Food & Music Festival, Kerry, Republic of Ireland (Cancelled)
 27 June 2015 – Whelan's, Dublin, Republic of Ireland
 25 September 2015 – Reeperbahn Festival, Hamburg, Germany
 28 November 2015 – The Railway Tavern, Winchester, United Kingdom
 30 November 2015 – Union Chapel, London, United Kingdom

Proposed songs
 Laughter appeared as 'There's Only Love' on her previous album release Let It Break. Laughter is a demo version of 'There's Only Love' and previously appeared as 'Jets' in 2012.
Joy
This Shit I Own 
Caught My Hand (appears on the album as Caught)
Chasing
To Be Your Honey
Palomino
Making My Way Back

Charts

Critical reception

Upon release Bones+Longing received positive reviews from critics.

The UK's MOJO gave the album 4/5. London's Evening Standard described the album as 'still drifting beautifully onwards...' RTÉ 2XM featured the LP in their Albums of The Week describing the album as "...her strongest album...that will enchant even the most cynical musical soul". Drowned in Sound gave the album 8/10 saying it is full of 'depth and texture'. The Arts Desk defined the album as "bound to form an intimate bond with its audience". Q Magazine defined the album as 'Spellbinding'.

Release history

Personnel
 Gemma Hayes – vocals, guitar, piano, arrangement, producer, programming, bassline programming, vocal arrangement, voice arrangement
 David Odlum – producer, engineer, guitar, synth, beats, bass and vocals 
 Romy – keys, synths and vocals
 Mark Stanley – Guest drummer on 'Iona'
 Simon Long – Manager & Photography
 Pip – Photography
 Jayne Gould – Design
 Humphrey Bangham – Artwork

References

2014 albums
Gemma Hayes albums